Anna: 6 - 18 or  is a documentary film by director Nikita Mikhalkov, which was shot during a period of thirteen years, from 1980 to 1993. The main heroine of the film is Anna, the eldest daughter of Mikhalkov. Anna herself has repeatedly said that she strongly disliked the picture, explaining that she considers it a "dissection of her private life" and "exhibitionism of the soul".

Plot
Over the years of her life (from 6 to 18 years) daughter of film director Anna answers the same questions about her father. The viewer has the opportunity to observe how Anna's point of view changes concerning her surrounding world. The girl's answers are edited with newsreel footage of those years during which the questions were asked. Through the prism of Anna's responses many key events are represented: the death of General Secretary Leonid Brezhnev, Yuri Andropov, Konstantin Chernenko, the restructuring, collapse of the Soviet Union, and the rise of Yeltsinism.

Cast
 Anna Mikhalkova – Nikita Mikhalkov's eldest daughter
 Nadezhda Mikhalkova – Nikita Mikhalkov's youngest daughter
 Artyom Mikhalkov – Nikita Mikhalkov's second son
 Nikita Mikhalkov – himself

Awards
"Silver Dove" of the international documentary film festival in Leipzig (1994)
Grand Prix of International Film Festival of Slavic and Orthodox peoples "Golden Knight" (1994)
Prize for Best Documentary at the Hamptons International Film Festival (1996)

External links

References

1993 films
Soviet documentary films
Soviet avant-garde and experimental films
Russian documentary films
Films directed by Nikita Mikhalkov
Films scored by Eduard Artemyev
Russian avant-garde and experimental films
1993 documentary films
Russian nonlinear narrative films
Films produced by Nikita Mikhalkov
Films with screenplays by Nikita Mikhalkov